The Stolpersteine in Hranice na Moravě lists the Stolpersteine in the town Hranice na Moravě, Czech Republic. Stolpersteine is the German name for stumbling blocks collocated all over Europe by German artist Gunter Demnig. They remember the fate of the Nazi victims being murdered, deported, exiled or driven to suicide.

Generally, the stumbling blocks are posed in front of the building where the victims had their last self-chosen residence. The name of the Stolpersteine in Czech is: Kameny zmizelých, stones of the disappeared.

History of the Jews in Hranice na Moravě 
Between 1475 and 1553, the first Jews settled in Hranice. By 1753, 115 families of Jewish faith were already living in the city. In 1864, the synagogue was destroyed and rebuilt. After the end of the Thirty Years' War, the Jewish cemetery was inaugurated. Around 1770, a Jewish school was inaugurated, with Jewish teachers as well as non-Jewish teachers. The medium of instruction was German. In 1857, 802 people of Jewish faith lived in Hranice, but over the years many of them moved to larger cities and settled there. In 1858, Julius Freud, Sigmund Freud's brother, was buried in the Jewish cemetery of Hranice. In 1919, the Jewish school was closed. In 1939, 271 people of Jewish faith lived in Hranice. As of 1940, worship was prohibited in the synagogue, now serving as storage space for furniture. The last rabbi of the congregation, Jacob Rabinowitz, had left the city to go to Palestine in 1937. In 1941, the deportations began. Most Jewish inhabitants were deported to Olomouc on 22 June 1942. From there, some were brought to the East and shot at unknown locations. Others were deported to Theresienstadt concentration camp and from there to Auschwitz, where they were finally murdered. Only 14 of the deportees returned to Hranice after the war. Surviving Lisa Gesslerová speaks of only five survivors who returned to the city. Among the few were the two daughters of the Gessler family, Lída and Lisa Gesslerová. There was a brief revival of the Jewish community and until 1969 a prayer house existed in Hranice. The synagogue was reconstructed in 1996. It serves as a museum and an art gallery.

Stolpersteine

Dates of collocations
The Stolpersteine in Hranice na Moravě were collocated by the artist himself on 12 August 2015.

See also
 List of cities by country that have stolpersteine

References

External links

 stolpersteine.eu, Demnig's website
 holocaust.cz

Hranice
Monuments and memorials